Gu Zhutong ( or Wade-Giles Ku Chu-tung; 1893 – January 17, 1987), courtesy name Moshan (墨山), was a military general and administrator of the Republic of China.

Biography

Early life and career

Gu was born in Lianshui, Jiangsu province and attended army elementary academy at age 19, When the Chinese Revolution of 1911 broke out, he soon joined the Revolution. In 1912, he joined the Chinese Nationalist Party, and enrolled in Wuhan reserve officer candidate school, and then attend the Baoding Military Academy. In 1922, he went to Canton and became a staff officer of Second Cantonese Army. When Whampoa Military Academy was founded in 1924, he became one of the academy instructors. When the newly formed nationalist government launched a campaign against a local warlord, he became a battalion commander. During the Northern Expedition, Gu was promoted division commander and then corps commander. In the Central Plains War, he was the commander of the 16th route army. In 1931, he became garrison commander of Nanjing, the capital of the nationalist government. In 1933 he participated in the anti-communist Encirclement Campaigns. In 1935 he was promoted to general and put in charge of three southwestern provinces, meanwhile he was also the chairman of Jiangsu province. After the breakout of the second Sino-Japanese war, he was named commander-in-chief of the third war zone, during the New Fourth Army Incident in 1941 nationalist units under his command destroyed a large contingent of communist troops, and Chiang Kai-shek decorated him with the Order of Blue Sky and White Sun, one of the highest honors for a Chinese commander at the time.

Chinese Civil War
In 1946, he was named commander-in-chief of the nationalist army and pacification director of Zhengzhou, and was put in charge attack communist-controlled areas in Shandong province. In 1947, he lost the critical Menglianggu Campaign, in which the elite 74th independent enhanced division was wiped out by the communist forces. Chiang Kai-shek relieved him of command, and appointed him as Chief of Staff instead.

In Taiwan
In March 1950, he arrived in Taiwan and was appointed as defense minister, and in 1954 he was promoted to four-star general. In 1956, Gu was appointed as secretary general of the National Defense Council; in 1967 he was named as deputy head of the strategic advisory committee. In 1972, he became an advisor to Chiang Kai-shek and died on January 17, 1987.

Private Life
His son was the artist Ku Fu-sheng.

References

 http://www.generals.dk/general/Qiu_Qing-quan/_/China.html
 Ministry of National Defense R.O.C
US Naval War College
 https://web.archive.org/web/20090326011824/http://cgsc.leavenworth.army.mil/carl/download/csipubs/bjorge_huai.pdf

People of the Northern Expedition
National Revolutionary Army generals from Jiangsu
1893 births
1987 deaths
Recipients of the Order of Blue Sky and White Sun
Recipients of the Order of Chiang Chung-Cheng
People from Huai'an
Chinese Civil War refugees
Taiwanese people from Jiangsu